József Balogh (born 1956) is a Hungarian clarinetist.

Balogh was a student of Béla Kovács at the Franz Liszt College of Music in Budapest. He is a solo clarinetist in the Budapest Opera and Budapest Radio Symphony Orchestra. He has been the president of the Hungarian Clarinet Society since 1994.

Discography
 Contrasts - Hungarian Clarinet Music, with various artists. FonTrade, 1990
 Mozart: Clarinet Trio, Clarinet Quartets, with various artists. Naxos, 1994.
 Brahms: Clarinet Trio & Quintet, with Danubius Quartet. Naxos, 1994.
 Beethoven: Chamber Music For Horns, Winds And Strings, with various artists. Naxos, 1995.
 Adagio Beethoven, with various artists. Naxos, 1997.
 Music for the Mozart Effect, with various artists. Spring Hill Music, 1998.
 Mozart Effect: Music for Little Ones, with various artists. Children's Group, 2000.
 Interclarinet, with various artists. Farao Classics, 2007.

References

1956 births
Living people
Clarinetists
Hungarian musicians
Place of birth missing (living people)
21st-century clarinetists